"So Young/Tell Me" is the debut double A-side single by English rock band The Stone Roses, produced by Martin Hannett and released in 1985 on Thin Line. The single went without much notice outside of Manchester, and demonstrates a very different aggressive punk\New wave style than the band's later material with Reni in particular showcasing a more exuberant drumming style.

"So Young" was originally titled "Misery Dictionary", but the band changed the song's title to make it sound less negative and because they did not want people to think that they were influenced by The Smiths who had similarly titled songs, such as "Miserable Lie" and "Heaven Knows I'm Miserable Now".

The front cover artwork was produced by John Squire, who smashed an old transistor radio and then glued the parts together.

Ian Brown has since distanced himself from the songs, saying he "wouldn't pay 10p for it now" and that it sounded like "four lads trying to get out of Manchester".

The single later appeared as part of the Compact Disc Singles Collection, an 8-CD collection of the band's singles released by Silvertone in 1992. Both songs also featured on the compilation albums The Complete Stone Roses and Garage Flower

Track listing

1985 release
with So Young/Tell Me on the cover
12-inch vinyl (Thin Line THIN 001)
 So Young (3:30)
 Tell Me (3:50)

1992 issue
with just So Young on the cover
CD (Silvertone ORE CD 37)
only available as part of a box set
 So Young (3:30)
 Tell Me (3:50)

References

1985 singles
The Stone Roses songs
Post-punk songs
1985 songs